Saša Kolunija (born 9 June 1987) is a Bosnian Serb professional football player.

Career
Kolunija was born in Travnik and played with Serbian clubs FK Bežanija, FK Voždovac and FK Radnički Beograd between 2005 and 2009. After spending three seasons at Pas Hamedan F.C., Kolunija joined Gahar Zagros F.C., in July 2012.

In January 2016, Kolunija signed for FC Akzhayik in the Kazakhstan Premier League. In November 2016, Kolunija signed for DSK Shivajians in the Indian I-League.

References

External links
 
 Saša Kolunija stats at utakmica.rs

Living people
1987 births
People from Travnik
Serbs of Bosnia and Herzegovina
Serbian footballers
Serbian expatriate footballers
Kazakhstan Premier League players
FK Bežanija players
FK Voždovac players
FK Radnički Beograd players
FK Rad players
FK Zemun players
Pas players
Gahar Zagros players
FC Akzhayik players
DSK Shivajians FC players
I-League players
Expatriate footballers in Iran
Expatriate footballers in Kazakhstan
Association football defenders
Bosnia and Herzegovina expatriate sportspeople in India